Märcani or Mardzhani may refer to:

Märcani Mosque, a mosque in Kazan, Russia, built in 1766–1770
Şihabetdin Märcani (1818–1889), Tatar Muslim theologian and historian